Operation Angel may refer to:

Operation Angel, an Australian humanitarian organisation founded by Jacqueline Pascarl
Operation Angel, a British charity headed by Sally Becker